This is a list of fellows of the Royal Society elected in 1704.

Fellows
 Francis Annesley (1663–1750)
 John Arbuthnot (1667–1735)
 Walter Clavell (fl. 1704–1740)
 William Fellowes (1660–1724)
 John Fuller (1680–1745)
 Prince George of Denmark (1653–1708)
 Samuel Morland (d. 1722)
 Andrew Tooke (1673–1732)

References

1704
1704 in science
1704 in England